Grammothele bambusicola is a poroid crust fungus in the family Polyporaceae that is found in Asia. It was described as new to science in 1984 by Norwegian mycologist Leif Ryvarden.

Description
Fruit bodies of the fungus are crust-like, measuring up to 1 mm thick, with a pore surface colour ranging from cream to straw to pale yellowish brown. The shallow pores number 2–3 per millimetre.

G. bambusicola has a dimitic hyphal system; its generative hyphae have clamp connections. Spores are more or less ellipsoid in shape, thin-walled, and measure 7–8.5 by 4–5 μm. The fungus is similar in morphology to Grammothele ochracea (found in Thailand), but differs from that species in having larger pores, more yellowish colour, and spores that are longer and more ellipsoid.

Habitat and distribution
It was found growing on Bambusa. The species was later reported from Takatsuki, Osaka.

References

bambusicola
Fungi described in 1984
Fungi of Asia
Taxa named by Leif Ryvarden